The Dolores River Canyon is located in southwestern Colorado, USA, west of the town of Naturita and north of the town of Dove Creek.

Dolores River Canyon is a dramatic canyon composed of red Wingate Sandstone.  The entire canyon sits on lands administered by the Bureau of Land Management and has been proposed for wilderness designation under the provisions of the 1964 Wilderness Act.

The Hanging Flume is located on the canyon wall.

References

Canyons and gorges of Colorado
Geology of Colorado
Protected areas of Montezuma County, Colorado
Wilderness areas of Colorado
Bureau of Land Management areas in Colorado
Landforms of Montezuma County, Colorado